Jet Star 2 is a Schwarzkopf steel sitdown roller coaster at Lagoon Amusement Park in Farmington, Utah. It opened in 1976.

History 
Jet Star 2 was designed by famous ride designer Anton Schwarzkopf and was first operated at the 1974 World's Fair in Spokane, WA. After the fair ended, Lagoon purchased Jet Star 2 and relocated it to the park in 1976. Since its relocation to Lagoon, the ride is and has always been a central part of the North Midway section of Lagoon. Jet Star 2 has had many mechanical problems over the years but the system has been overhauled to be more reliable in recent years.

Previously, Jet Star 2 had a blinking lighted sign at the top of the lift hill. This sign was removed when the ride was repainted with its current bright red and yellow color scheme in 2006. Before 2005, the colors on Jet Star 2 were reversed with red track and yellow supports. In 2012, Jet Star 2's loading platform was remodeled slightly so that the capacity could increase due to its constant popularity.

Jet Star 2 had a large enough impact with the local residents of Spokane, WA during the 1974 World's Fair that local brewery NoLi Brewhouse has named one of their brews "Jet Star" after the ride.

Experience 
The ride starts with a spiral lift, which can sometimes be known as the "hot rail" or "power track". Once at the top of the lift, the vehicle descends a hill, then takes a left turn, another right turn, and another smaller drop. The ride then goes into a series of drops, and turns (these turns after the second stop being called the south carousel) before hitting the final reduction and staging brake run and stopping at an unloading station. After unloading, the vehicles return to the loading station.

Jet Star 2's trains are unique in that they do not have lap bar restraints like a traditional roller coaster. Instead, the restraints are much more like seat belts in a traditional automobile that allow for much more free movement. Riders may have to ride on laps of larger riders if they wish to ride together. Each train has three of these large seats available, allowing for up to six riders at a time. Lagoon's policy is that no single riders may ride on Jet Star 2 and that only 2 riders will be required in the front section of the train, allowing a maximum of 8 riders per train.

References 

Lagoon (amusement park)
1976 establishments in Utah